Smoking in France  was first restricted on public transport by the 1976 Veil law.  Further restrictions were established in the 1991 Évin law, which contains a variety of measures against alcoholism and tobacco consumption. A much stronger smoking ban was introduced on 1 February 2007. Smoking in enclosed public places such as offices, schools, government buildings and restaurants is strictly prohibited. Law officials may enforce the laws with minimum fines set at €500.

History
The Veil law is named after Simone Veil, the French health minister, who took an initiative to fight against tobacco smoking in France in 1976. Veil banned advertising for tobacco or tobacco products and required tobacco companies to print severe warnings on their cigarette packages, such as "Abus Dangereux – [Overuse is Hazardous]." Another significant aspect of the Veil Law was to place limitations on smoking places affectés à un usage collectif (open to the public).

The Évin law is named after Claude Évin, the minister who pushed for it. The law leaves certain important criteria on what is allowed or not with respect to smoking sections to executive-issued regulations, and it is those regulations that were altered in 2007.
 
A legal challenge against the new regulations was filed before the Conseil d'État in 2007, but was rejected. Under the initial implementation rules of the 1991 Évin law, restaurants, cafés etc. just had to provide smoking and non-smoking sections, which in practice were often not well separated. In larger establishments, smoking and non-smoking sections could be separate rooms, but often they were just areas within the same room.

Current status

Smoking and vaping are banned in all indoor public places (government buildings, offices, public transport, universities, museums, restaurants, cafés, nightclubs, etc.). Cafés and shops selling tobacco-related products are submitted to the same regulations. No exceptions exist for special smoking rooms fulfilling strict conditions.
Additionally, some outdoor public places also ban smoking and vaping (railway stations).

As of 2015, 32% of French adults declare themselves to be regular smokers.

In case of violation of tobacco laws, the smoker can face a fine of up to €450 and the owner of the venue up to €750.

Plain packaging for cigarettes was introduced in 2017.

See also 
 Plain tobacco packaging

References

 
French culture